The 2019 Volta Limburg Classic was the 46th edition of the Volta Limburg Classic cycle race and was held on 6 April 2019 as part of the 2019 UCI Europe Tour. The race started and finished in Eijsden. The race was won by Patrick Müller.

Teams
Twenty-four teams were invited to take part in the race. These included seven UCI Professional Continental teams and seventeen UCI Continental teams.

UCI Professional Continental Teams

 
 
 
 
 
 
 

UCI Continental Teams

 Alecto Cycling Team
 
 
 
 
 
 
 Joker Fuel of Norway
 
 Lotto–Kern Haus
 
 
 Monkey Town - à Bloc
 
 
 
 Vlasman Cycling Team

Results

References

2019
2019 UCI Europe Tour
2019 in Dutch sport